Kiprijonas Maculevičius (1830–1906) was a Polish-Lithuanian architect and painter. Vilnius main city architect in years 1879-1893.

See also
List of Lithuanian painters

References
Universal Lithuanian Encyclopedia

1879-1893).

Architects from Vilnius
1830 births
1906 deaths
19th-century Polish painters
19th-century Polish architects
19th-century Polish male artists
19th-century Lithuanian painters